Dahlem is a municipality in the district of Euskirchen. It has the lowest population density and population of all municipalities of in the state of North Rhine-Westphalia, Germany. It is located in the Eifel hills, approx. 35 km south-west of Euskirchen. The small medieval town Kronenburg is part of the municipality.

Geography 
Dahlem is located in the northern Eifel region in the High Fens – Eifel Nature Park between Blankenheim in the Northeast and Stadtkyll the southwest. The Kyll flows through the region from the Glaadtbach. The Heidenköpfe lie in the Ripsdorfer forest to the east.

References

External links

Municipalities in North Rhine-Westphalia
Euskirchen (district)